Shimon Charnuha (born May 10, 1948) is a former Israeli footballer who played in Maccabi Netanya and Beitar Jerusalem.

References

1948 births
Israeli Jews
Living people
Israeli footballers
Israel international footballers
Beitar Jerusalem F.C. players
Maccabi Netanya F.C. players
Liga Leumit players
Footballers from Jerusalem
Association football defenders